Windom may refer to:

Places
United States
Windom, Indiana
Windom, Kansas
Windom, Minnesota
Windom, Minneapolis, Minnesota
Windom Park, Minneapolis, Minnesota
Windom Township, Minnesota
Windom, Missouri
Windom, North Carolina
Windom, New York
Windom, Oklahoma
Windom, Pennsylvania
Windom, South Dakota
Windom, Texas
Windom, West Virginia
Windom Peak in Colorado

People with the surname
Steve Windom, American politician
William Windom, American politician
William Windom (actor)

Other uses
Toyota Windom
USS Windom (1896)
a multi-band dipole antenna used in amateur radio